Zinny J. Zan (born Bo Stagman on January 18, 1964 and earlier known as Bosse Belsen) is a Swedish rock/glam metal singer who is the former lead-singer for Shotgun Messiah and is currently the founder and frontman for Zan Clan and reunited Easy Action.

Musical career
Zinny J. Zan is probably best known internationally as the original lead singer for the 1980s glam metal band Shotgun Messiah (1985–90). However, he was already well known in his native Sweden by the time he was 18, when his band Easy Action (1981–85) toured Scandinavia and soon thereafter signed a contract with Warner Bros. Records.  Easy Action was the first Swedish music artist ever to sign a worldwide deal.

His music career started earlier when he played drums in band such as Belsen Boys, Alarm X and Beauty Box. He was also singer in Brilliant Boys.

Zinny's work with Easy Action included one album as well as a Swedish slasher movie titled Blood Tracks, which Easy Action both provided the music for and starred in.

After a few years of enjoying local success touring the Scandinavia region, Zinny wanted the band to try to make a go of it in the U.S., while the other members of the band were hesitant to leave their home country. These conflicting views eventually prompted Zinny to leave Sweden for New York and start looking for a new band.

He was soon contacted by fellow Swedes Tim Sköld and Harry Cody and asked to join Kingpin (the band that would eventually become Shotgun Messiah). While still performing under the name Kingpin, the band recorded the album Welcome to Bop City. After being signed to Relativity Records and relocating to Hollywood, California, they changed their name to Shotgun Messiah and remixed and released the Bop City album as Shotgun Messiah's self-titled debut album.

The album Shotgun Messiah was a moderate success, spawning three fairly popular singles as well as two music videos for MTV and reaching #52 on the American Billboard chart. Eventually though, personality and creative differences between Harry, Tim and Zinny began to grow and led to Zinny's departure from Shotgun Messiah in 1990.

After the split, Zinny went back to Stockholm to recalibrate, but due to various personal problems (a divorce, the death of his father, his sister's cancer diagnosis, and his own battle with a stomach disease), it would be over four years before the eventual 1994 release of the album Citizen of Wasteland, credited to his new band Zan Clan. The album saw rather limited success.

In 2002, Zinny would record and release the solo album City Boy Blues which enjoyed moderate commercial and critical success in Scandinavia and earned distinction as the "Comeback Album of the Year" in the UK´s Classic Rock Magazine but failed to garner much attention in the U.S.

Zinny then signed a TV contract to be the Tour Manager and Mentor for a band called Tribal Ink for the TV show Wannabe in 2002.

Shortly thereafter, Zinny would resurrect the Zan Clan with a new line up including producer/guitarist/songwriter friend Chris Laney.  In 2005, the Zan Clan released the album We Are Zan Clan, Who The Fuck Are You in addition to opening a series of shows in Europe for Whitesnake and Queensrÿche.

Easy Action reunion
In 2006, Zinny reunited with his former Easy Action bandmate, guitarist Kee Marcello (who had served a stint in the band Europe in the interim) for a Reunion gig at Sweden Rock Festival. This performance led to more shows for Easy Action, including serving as the opening act for Twisted Sister on their farewell tour in 2007.

In 2008, Easy Action released a new single "Jack's Back" (Produced by Chris Laney) and opened up The Speedway Grand Prix at Ullevi in Gothenburg.  This tune remained on the singles chart in Sweden for weeks.

At one point later in the 2000s, it was reported that Zinny and Easy Action were finishing up the recording of their new album, which had the working title of Looking Up Your Old Address.  However, in 2013, it was revealed that the Looking Up Your Old Address album would not be released, as Easy Action had split up once again, with Kee and Zinny parting ways.

Influences and Tributes
Zinny was heavily influenced by such bands as Aerosmith, Kiss, Sex Pistols, and Thin Lizzy, inspirations which are reflected in his songwriting and singing style.

In addition to his work with numerous bands, he has also performed on several tribute albums.  He contributed to the FastLane Records release Tricked Out, a tribute to Cheap Trick, where he performed the CT hit "Surrender."  He later also contributed a cover version of the Thin Lizzy song "Dedication" to the A Tribute to Phil Lynott album.

Recent years/Currently
Zinny is reportedly in the process of writing an autobiography titled The Lies and Faults of Zinny J. Zan which will reveal everything, from groupies to "behind-the-scenes" content within his bands and the record industry.

On April 19, 2013, Zinny released the single "The Perfect Age of Rock n Roll," which also appears on the soundtrack for the American movie of the same name starring Peter Fonda.

Later in 2013, Zinny also put together the band Shotgun, an idea proposed by his old musical partner, Chris Laney, and Rob Marcello (not to be confused with his former Easy Action bandmate, Kee Marcello) in commemoration of the upcoming 25th anniversary of Shotgun Messiah's highly acclaimed debut album. Pekka "Stixx" Ollinen, original drummer in Shotgun Messiah also came on board for this celebration tour, which included stints at The Club in STHLM; Sticky Fingers in GTB; and a number of Festivals such as Grebbestad Festival, Skogsröjet, and the grand finale at Väsby Rock Festival. In 2014, Zinny became a member of the Väsby Rock Festival Management, making the festival a two-day event, as opposed to its previous one-day duration.

In 2017, Zinny released his first-ever solo album in his native language, Swedish, under his birthname, Stagman. The album, titled Är Ni Kvar Därute? ("Are You Still Out There?"), features former Easy Action 2006 bandmates, drummer – and in this case also producer – Björn Höglund and guitarist Simon Roxx, along with a few other great musicians such as Martin Sweet (Crash Diet) and Nalle Påhlsson (Treat, Therion) to name a few.

Personal life
Zinny is a father of two children: a daughter Yasmine and a son Zack (born 2009), the latter of whose mother is Zinny's fiancée for the last 14 years, Beatrice.

Previous bands
Belsen Boys, Brilliant Boys, Alarm X, Bangshot, Dream Police,  Grand Slam

Discography

Easy Action
 Easy Action (1983) – vocals
"We Go Rocking [New 2008 version]" / "Jack's Back" (single, Official Speedway Grand Prix Anthem 2008)

Kingpin
 Welcome To Bop City (1988) – vocals

Shotgun Messiah
 Shotgun Messiah (1989) – vocals

Zinny J. Zan
City Boy Blues (2002) – vocals

Zinny Zan
 "The Perfect Age of Rock 'n Roll" (single)(2013) The Perfect Age of Rock n Roll Movie soundtrack

Zan Clan
Citizen of Wasteland (1994) – vocals
We Are Zan Clan, Who the Fuck Are You (2005) – vocals
(Kickz the living shit outta Stockholm City) Live album recorded at Klubben STHLM (2006)

Stagman
 Är Ni Kvar Därute? (Are You Still Out There? - album in Swedish) (2017) – vocals

See alsoTim SköldHarry K. CodyEasy Action (band)Shotgun Messiah''

References

External links
The Sweet Success of Smell Business Week
Top 5 Hidden Gems of the 80s Guitar World
Review of Stagman - Är ni kvar därute? Music & Festival Reviews

1964 births
Living people
Musicians from Stockholm
Shotgun Messiah members
Glam metal musicians
Swedish male musicians
Swedish heavy metal singers
Easy Action (band) members